The Grand Orient of Poland (Polish: Wielki Wschód Polski) is a Masonic grand lodge in Poland. It is a member of the European Masonic Association (EMA/AME), in the continental or liberal branch of Freemasonry.

Grand Orient of Poland was established on February 26, 1784 on the basis of a patent granted by the Grand Orient of France. In its first phase of his functioning, it was active until the beginning of the 19th century, when Freemasonry in the Polish lands occupied by Russia (under Russian partition) at that time was forbidden by the Russian Tsar.

At the beginning of the twentieth century, there were attempts to revive it by two progressive lodges of the Grand Orient of France operating in eastern Poland, but Grand Orient of France actually did it only in 1990 when its Lodge Victor Schoelcher set up the Polish Lodge "Liberty Restored" (La Liberté Recouvrée), which then, in 1997 became the main lodge of the restored Grand Orient of Poland. At that time the Grand Orient of France gave it a renewed founding patent and new patents for the French Rite, the  Ancient and Accepted Scottish Rite, and the Scottish Rectified Rite. The Grand Orient of Poland is registered as an association in the provincial court in Warsaw on November 14, 1997 (KRS no. 0000120900, reference number WA.XII NS-REJ.KRS / 87318/16/404).

The first grandmaster of the reconstructed Grand Orient of Poland was the internationally known Polish philosopher and writer Andrzej Nowicki.

It is different from the Polish National Grand Lodge (Wielka Loża Narodowa Polski). The Grand Orient of Poland should also not be confused with so-called "Grand Orient of the Republic of Poland" - an unofficial association established in unclear circumstances on 25 February 2017.

Lodges of the Grand Orient of Poland 
 Wolność Przywrócona ('Restored Freedom') (Warsaw)
 Galileusz (Bydgoszcz)
 Cezary Leżeński (Warsaw)
 Moria (Riga/Latvia)
 Witelon (a travelling lodge)
 Atanor (Warsaw)
 Abraxas under the Light of Sirius (Warsaw/Poznań)
 Universe (English speaking lodge) (Warsaw)
Astrolabium (Kraków)
Synergy (Europe)
Falcon and Owl (Poznań)

International Cooperation 
Based on mutual agreements of friendship and cooperation, the Grand Orient of Poland cooperates internationally with following organisations and Orders:

Grand Orient of France
Grand Orient of Switzerland
Grand Lodge of Italy
Grand Orient of Romania
Grand Orient of Ireland
 Grand Lodge Lemuria (Mauritius)
 Traditional Masonic Order - Mauritius
Grand Orient of Slovenia
 International Masonic Order DELPHI - Greece
Grand Orient of Belgium
Grand National Lodge of Croatia
Grande Loge Féminine de France
Spanish Symbolic Grand Lodge
Grand Orient of Bulgaria
Grand Orient of Austria
Grand Orient of Estonia
Grande Loja Feminina de Portugal
Grande Loge Indépendante et Souveraine des Rites Unis

The Grand Orient of Poland is also represented in international organisations:

European Masonic Alliance (founding member)
Adogmatic Association Central and Eastern Europe
Universal League of Freemasons

References

External links
 Official webpage of the Grand Orient of Poland
 Official Facebook page of the Grand Orient of Poland
  About the Grand Orient of Poland, webpage of the Lodge Galileusz
  History of the Polish freemasonry

Freemasonry in Poland